Bellvale Mountain is a mountain range located near Bellvale in Orange County, New York. It is a continuation of Bearfort Mountain in New Jersey. The Appalachian Trail is located along the ridge of the mountain. Puddingstone of the Skunnemunk Conglomerate is visible along the ridge.

References

Mountain ranges of New York (state)
Landforms of Orange County, New York
Mountains on the Appalachian Trail